Letitia Cope Hochstrasser Fickel (born 16 March 1963) is a New Zealand education academic and academic administrator. She is currently a full professor and acting pro-vice chancellor at the University of Canterbury.

Academic career

After a 1998 EdD at the University of Louisville titled  'Teacher culture and community : an ethnography of a high school social studies department,'  Fickel worked at the University of Alaska Anchorage before moving to the University of Canterbury in 2010.

Selected works 
 Darling-Hammond, Linda, Maritza B. Macdonald, Jon Snyder, Betty Lou Whitford, Gordon Ruscoe, and Letitia Fickel. Studies of Excellence in Teacher Education: Preparation at the Graduate Level. AACTE Publications, 1307 New York Avenue, NW, Suite 300, Washington, DC , 2000.
 Fickel, Letitia Hochstrasser. "Democracy is messy: Exploring the personal theories of a high school social studies teacher." Theory & Research in Social Education 28, no. 3 (2000): 359–389.
 Fickel, Letitia Hochstrasser. "Quality professional development: Suggestions about process and content." In The educational forum, vol. 67, no. 1, pp. 47–54. Taylor & Francis Group, 2003.
 Fickel, Letitia. "Paradox of practice: Expanding and contracting curriculum in a high-stakes climate." Measuring history: Cases of state-level testing across the United States (2006): 75–103.
 Fickel, Letitia Hochstrasser. "Teachers, tundra, and talking circles: Learning history and culture in an Alaska Native village." Theory & Research in Social Education 33, no. 4 (2005): 476–507.

References

Living people
New Zealand women academics
University of Louisville alumni
University of Alaska Anchorage faculty
Academic staff of the University of Canterbury
New Zealand educational theorists
New Zealand women writers
1963 births